Emily Yacina is an American musician from Philadelphia, Pennsylvania.

History
Yacina first began her career in 2011, releasing an album titled Flood. Also in 2011, Yacina released her second full-length album titled Reverie. In 2013, Yacina released her second full-length album titled Bloom. Yacina released her first two EPs in December 2015. The first, titled Pull Through, was released in January. The second, titled Soft Stuff, was released in December. Yacina released a five song EP in September 2016 called Nice Try. In 2017, Yacina got a job working at an environmental nonprofit in Fairbanks, Alaska. During her time working there, she wrote and recorded her third full-length album titled Heart Sky.
 Yacina released a three-song EP titled Katie in early 2018. Yacina's fourth full-length album, Remember The Silver, was released in December 2019.

In addition to being a solo artist, Yacina is also a frequent collaborator with the musician Alex G.

References

Musicians from Philadelphia